Tennis exhibition matches and tournaments in 1988.

Exhibition tennis tournaments
1988 in tennis